Dimdim Castle was a Kurdish fortress located on top of Mount Dimdim in West Azerbaijan Province of Iran, just west of Lake Urmia. This fortress was the location of Battle of Dimdim. 

According to Kurdish oral tradition the fortress was built in the pre-Islamic era. The castle suffered an attack by Safavid Empire and got sacked in 1609, then rebuilt by the Amir Khan Lepzerin in the same year. Other source mentioned that the siege of Dimdim Castle was in 1610.

Name 
The word "Dimdim" may be onomatopoeic for the noise which the stones of the castle made when they dropped from the castle into the valley.

See also
 Battle of Dimdim
 Ottoman–Safavid War (1603–18)
 List of castles in Iran

References

Sources
 

Kurdish historical sites
Battle of Dimdim
Castles in Iran
History of West Azerbaijan Province

National works of Iran